The 2016–17 Detroit Pistons season was the 76th season of the franchise, the 69th in the National Basketball Association (NBA), and the 60th in Metro Detroit. It was the Pistons' final season at The Palace of Auburn Hills in nearby Auburn Hills, Michigan, ending a 42-year history of professional sports in Oakland County.  They moved to the new Little Caesars Arena in Detroit for the 2017–18 season.

Draft picks

Roster

Standings

Division

Conference

Game log

Pre-season

|- style="background:#fbb;"
| 1 
| October 6
| @ Brooklyn
| 
| Morris & Drummond (17)
| Andre Drummond (21)
| Caldwell-Pope & McCallum (4)
| Barclays Center8,782
| 0–1
|- style="background:#fbb;"
| 2 
| October 10
| San Antonio
| 
| Andre Drummond (17)
| Andre Drummond (13)
| Leuer & Smith (5)
| Palace of Auburn Hills12,103
| 0–2
|- style="background:#bfb;"
| 3 
| October 13
| @ Atlanta
| 
| Harris & Smith (18)
| Jon Leuer (9)
| Ish Smith (8)
| Philips Arena10,852
| 1–2
|- style="background:#bfb;"
| 4 
| October 15
| @ Philadelphia
| 
| Tobias Harris (18)
| Andre Drummond (13)
| Ish Smith (6)
| Wells Fargo Center10,891
| 2–2
|- style="background:#bfb;"
| 5
| October 17
| Milwaukee
| 
| Kentavious Caldwell-Pope (23)
| Andre Drummond (13)
| Ish Smith (7)
| Palace of Auburn Hills10,096
| 3–2
|- style="background:#fbb;"
| 6 
| October 19
| Toronto
| 
| Andre Drummond (16)
| Andre Drummond (13)
| Lorenzo Brown (6)
| Palace of Auburn Hills22,076
| 3–3

Regular season

|- style="background:#fbb;"
| 1
| October 26
| @ Toronto
| 
| Tobias Harris (22)
| Morris & Leuer (9)
| Ish Smith (7)
| Air Canada Centre19,800
| 0–1
|- style="background:#bfb;"
| 2
| October 28
| Orlando
| 
| Tobias Harris (18)
| Andre Drummond (20)
| Ish Smith (8)
| Palace of Auburn Hills19,122
| 1–1
|- style="background:#bfb;"
| 3
| October 30
| Milwaukee
| 
| Kentavious Caldwell-Pope (21)
| Andre Drummond (23)
| Ish Smith (7)
| Palace of Auburn Hills15,161
| 2–1

|- style="background:#bfb;"
| 4
| November 1
| New York
| 
| Tobias Harris (25)
| Andre Drummond (13)
| Ish Smith (8)
| Palace of Auburn Hills13,087
| 3–1
|- style="background:#fbb;"
| 5
| November 2
| @ Brooklyn
| 
| Harris & Morris (23)
| Caldwell-Pope & Leuer (7)
| Ish Smith (7) 
| Barclays Center13,650
| 3–2
|- style="background:#bfb;"
| 6
| November 5
| Denver
| 
| Andre Drummond (19)
| Andre Drummond (20)
| Ish Smith (8)
| Palace of Auburn Hills16,218
| 4–2
|- style="background:#fbb;"
| 7
| November 7
| @ L.A. Clippers
| 
| Andre Drummond (15)
| Andre Drummond (12)
| Smith, Udrih & Johnson (3)
| Staples Center19,060
| 4–3
|- style="background:#fbb;"
| 8
| November 9
| @ Phoenix
| 
| Kentavious Caldwell-Pope (27)
| Andre Drummond (10)
| Ish Smith (7)
| Talking Stick Resort Arena16,719
| 4–4
|- style="background:#fbb;"
| 9
| November 11
| @ San Antonio
| 
| Andre Drummond (20)
| Andre Drummond (17)
| Kentavious Caldwell-Pope (7)
| AT&T Center18,418
| 4–5
|- style="background:#bfb;"
| 10
| November 12
| @ Denver
| 
| Tobias Harris (19)
| Andre Drummond (12)
| Ish Smith (8)
| Pepsi Center13,997
| 5–5
|- style="background:#bfb;"
| 11
| November 14
| Oklahoma City
| 
| Tobias Harris (22)
| Jon Leuer (9)
| Morris (5)
| Palace of Auburn Hills14,172
| 6–5
|- style="background:#fbb;"
| 12
| November 16
| @ New York
| 
| Kentavious Caldwell-Pope (21)
| Tobias Harris (10)
| Ish Smith (8)
| Madison Square Garden19,812
| 6–6
|- style="background:#fbb;"
| 13
| November 18
| @ Cleveland
| 
| Jon Leuer (15)
| Andre Drummond (10)
| Ish Smith (6)
| Quicken Loans Arena20,562
| 6–7
|- style="background:#fbb;"
| 14
| November 19
| Boston
| 
| Marcus Morris (24)
| Andre Drummond (17)
| Ish Smith (7)
| Palace of Auburn Hills16,107
| 6–8
|- style="background:#fbb;"
| 15
| November 21
| Houston
| 
| Kentavious Caldwell-Pope (26)
| Andre Drummond (16)
| Ish Smith (8)
| Palace of Auburn Hills13,632
| 6–9
|- style="background:#bfb;"
| 16
| November 23
| Miami
| 
| Kentavious Caldwell-Pope (22)
| Andre Drummond (15)
| Marcus Morris (6)
| Palace of Auburn Hills14,520
| 7–9
|- style="background:#bfb;"
| 17
| November 25
| L.A. Clippers
| 
| Marcus Morris (17)
| Jon Leuer (11)
| Kentavious Caldwell-Pope (10)
| Palace of Auburn Hills17,023
| 8–9
|- style="background:#fbb;"
| 18
| November 26
| @ Oklahoma City
| 
| Tobias Harris (21)
| Andre Drummond (8)
| Ish Smith (3)
| Chesapeake Energy Arena18,203
| 8–10
|- style="background:#bfb;"
| 19
| November 29
| @ Charlotte
| 
| Tobias Harris (24)
| Aron Baynes (8)
| Caldwell-Pope & Udrih (7)
| Spectrum Center14,266
| 9–10
|- style="background:#bfb;"
| 20
| November 30
| @ Boston
| 
| Kentavious Caldwell-Pope (25)
| Andre Drummond (17)
| Ish Smith (8)
| TD Garden17,338
| 10–10

|- style="background:#bfb;"
| 21
| December 2
| @ Atlanta
| 
| Kentavious Caldwell-Pope (23)
| Andre Drummond (14)
| Ish Smith (13)
| Philips Arena15,500
| 11–10
|- style="background:#fbb;"
| 22
| December 4
| Orlando
| 
| Marcus Morris (21)
| Andre Drummond (10)
| Caldwell-Pope & Jackson (4)
| Palace of Auburn Hills15,206
| 11–11
|- style="background:#bfb;"
| 23
| December 6
| Chicago
| 
| Tobias Harris (22)
| Andre Drummond (10)
| Reggie Jackson (7)
| Palace of Auburn Hills14,305
| 12–11
|- style="background:#fbb;"
| 24
| December 7
| @ Charlotte
| 
| Andre Drummond (26)
| Andre Drummond (20)
| Caldwell-Pope & Leuer (6)
| Spectrum Center15,141
| 12–12
|- style="background:#bfb;"
| 25
| December 9
| @ Minnesota
| 
| Andre Drummond (22)
| Andre Drummond (22)
| Kentavious Caldwell-Pope (7)
| Target Center14,109
| 13–12
|- style="background:#fbb;"
| 26
| December 11
| Philadelphia
| 
| Marcus Morris (28)
| Andre Drummond (14)
| Stanley Johnson (4)
| Palace of Auburn Hills7,244
| 13–13
|- style="background:#bfb;"
| 27
| December 14
| @ Dallas
| 
| Reggie Jackson (20)
| Andre Drummond (17)
| Jackson & Smith (6)
| American Airlines Center19,687
| 14–13
|- style="background:#fbb;"
| 28
| December 16
| @ Washington
| 
| Kentavious Caldwell-Pope (24)
| Andre Drummond (12)
| Jon Leuer (5)
| Verizon Center15,573
| 14–14
|- style="background:#fbb;"
| 29
| December 17
| Indiana
| 
| Kentavious Caldwell-Pope (20)
| Andre Drummond (15)
| Reggie Jackson (10)
| Palace of Auburn Hills15,231
| 14–15
|- style="background:#fbb;"
| 30
| December 19
| @ Chicago
| 
| Jon Leuer (16)
| Jon Leuer (5)
| Ish Smith (7)
| United Center21,400
| 14–16
|- style="background:#fbb;"
| 31
| December 21
| Memphis
| 
| Jackson & Leuer (18)
| Andre Drummond (19)
| Reggie Jackson (7)
| Palace of Auburn Hills16,033
| 14–17
|- style="background:#fbb;"
| 32
| December 23
| Golden State
| 
| Tobias Harris (26)
| Andre Drummond (9)
| Reggie Jackson (6)
| Palace of Auburn Hills21,012
| 14–18
|- style="background:#bfb;"
| 33
| December 26
| Cleveland
| 
| Tobias Harris (21)
| Andre Drummond (17)
| Reggie Jackson (6)
| Palace of Auburn Hills18,123
| 15–18
|- style="background:#fbb;"
| 34
| December 28
| Milwaukee
| 
| Tobias Harris (23)
| Tobias Harris (12)
| Kentavious Caldwell-Pope (7)
| Palace of Auburn Hills17,222
| 15–19
|- style="background:#fbb;"
| 35
| December 30
| @ Atlanta
| 
| Jon Leuer (22)
| Andre Drummond (15)
| Reggie Jackson (8)
| Philips Arena19,009
| 15–20

|- style="background:#bfb;"
| 36
| January 1
| @ Miami
| 
| Reggie Jackson (27)
| Andre Drummond (18)
| Kentavious Caldwell-Pope (5)
| American Airlines Arena19,844
| 16–20
|- style="background:#fbb;"
| 37
| January 3
| Indiana
| 
| Tobias Harris (22)
| Andre Drummond (14)
| Reggie Jackson (12)
| Palace of Auburn Hills13,435
| 16–21
|- style="background:#bfb;"
| 38
| January 5
| Charlotte
| 
| Tobias Harris (25)
| Boban Marjanović (19)
| Reggie Jackson (11)
| Palace of Auburn Hills13,723
| 17–21
|- style="background:#bfb;"
| 39
| January 8
| @ Portland
| 
| Reggie Jackson (31)
| Andre Drummond (14)
| Marcus Morris (5)
| Moda Center13,506
| 18–21
|- style="background:#fbb;"
| 40
| January 10
| @ Sacramento
| 
| Kentavious Caldwell-Pope (21)
| Andre Drummond (12)
| Jackson & Johnson (3)
| Golden 1 Center17,608
| 18–22
|- style="background:#fbb;"
| 41
| January 12
| @ Golden State
| 
| Marcus Morris (21)
| Boban Marjanović (11)
| Beno Udrih (4)
| Oracle Arena19,596
| 18–23
|- style="background:#fbb;"
| 42
| January 13
| @ Utah
|  
| Tobias Harris (13)
| Andre Drummond (19)
| Beno Udrih (7)
| Vivint Smart Home Arena18,564
| 18–24
|- style="background:#bfb;"
| 43
| January 15
| @ L.A. Lakers
| 
| Morris & Harris (23)
| Andre Drummond (17)
| Johnson & Smith (6)
| Staples Center18,997
| 19–24
|- style="background:#bfb;"
| 44
| January 18
| Atlanta
|  
| Reggie Jackson (26)
| Andre Drummond (17)
| Marcus Morris (7)
| Palace of Auburn Hills15,159
| 20–24
|- style="background:#bfb;"
| 45
| January 21
| Washington
| 
| Marcus Morris (25)
| Marcus Morris (11)
| Reggie Jackson (8)
| Palace of Auburn Hills18,231
| 21–24
|- style="background:#fbb;"
| 46
| January 23
| Sacramento
|  
| Reggie Jackson (18)
| Andre Drummond (12)
| Reggie Jackson (11)
| Palace of Auburn Hills14,017
| 21–25
|- style="background:#fbb;"
| 47
| January 28
| @ Miami
| 
| Reggie Jackson (24)
| Andre Drummond (20)
| Reggie Jackson (3)
| American Airlines Arena19,600
| 21–26
|- style="background:#fbb;"
| 48
| January 30
| @ Boston
| 
| Andre Drummond (28)
| Andre Drummond (22)
| Reggie Jackson (6)
| TD Garden18,188
| 21–27

|- style="background:#bfb;"
| 49
| February 1
| New Orleans
|  
| Kentavious Caldwell-Pope (38)
| Tobias Harris (8)
| Ish Smith (7)
| Palace of Auburn Hills14,262
| 22–27
|- style="background:#bfb;"
| 50
| February 3
| Minnesota
| 
| Marcus Morris (36)
| Andre Drummond (18)
| Reggie Jackson (8)
| Palace of Auburn Hills16,934
| 23–27
|- style="background:#fbb;"
| 51
| February 4
| @ Indiana
| 
| Marcus Morris (19)
| Andre Drummond (9)
| Ish Smith (6)
| Bankers Life Fieldhouse17,660
| 23–28
|- style="background:#bfb;"
| 52
| February 6
| Philadelphia
| 
| Marcus Morris (19)
| Andre Drummond (17)
| Reggie Jackson (6)
| Palace of Auburn Hills14,731
| 24–28
|- style="background:#bfb;"
| 53
| February 8
| L.A. Lakers
| 
| Andre Drummond (24)
| Andre Drummond (17)
| Reggie Jackson (8)
| Palace of Auburn Hills15,121
| 25–28
|- style="background:#fbb;"
| 54
| February 10
| San Antonio
| 
| Tobias Harris (16)
| Andre Drummond (15)
| Reggie Jackson (7)
| Palace of Auburn Hills17,222
| 25–29
|- style="background:#bfb;"
| 55
| February 12
| @ Toronto
| 
| Tobias Harris (24)
| Andre Drummond (18)
| Ish Smith (5)
| Air Canada Centre19,800
| 26–29
|- style="background:#fbb;"
| 56
| February 13
| @ Milwaukee
| 
| Marcus Morris (26)
| Andre Drummond (12)
| Reggie Jackson (9)
| BMO Harris Bradley Center13,397
| 26–30
|- style="background:#bfb;"
| 57
| February 15
| Dallas
| 
| Reggie Jackson (22)
| Marcus Morris (14)
| Reggie Jackson (4)
| Palace of Auburn Hills13,549
| 27–30
|- align="center"
|colspan="9" bgcolor="#bbcaff"|All-Star Break
|- style="background:#bfb;"
| 58
| February 23
| Charlotte
| 
| Kentavious Caldwell-Pope (33)
| Andre Drummond (13)
| Ish Smith (16)
| Palace of Auburn Hills14,913
| 28–30
|- style="background:#fbb;"
| 59
| February 26
| Boston
| 
| Kentavious Caldwell-Pope (18)
| Andre Drummond (15)
| Reggie Jackson (6)
| Palace of Auburn Hills20,141
| 28–31
|- style="background:#bfb;"
| 60
| February 28
| Portland
| 
| Marcus Morris (37)
| Andre Drummond (15)
| Ish Smith (7)
| Palace of Auburn Hills13,502
| 29–31

|- style="background:#fbb;"
| 61
| March 1
| @ New Orleans
| 
| Jon Leuer (22)
| Andre Drummond (17)
| Reggie Jackson (4)
| Smoothie King Center14,406
| 29–32
|- style="background:#bfb;"
| 62
| March 4
| @ Philadelphia
| 
| Kentavious Caldwell-Pope (26)
| Andre Drummond (14)
| Ish Smith (13)
| Wells Fargo Center19,523
| 30–32
|- style="background:#bfb;"
| 63
| March 6
| Chicago
| 
| Reggie Jackson (26)
| Drummond, Harris (8)
| Ish Smith (7)
| Palace of Auburn Hills16,039
| 31–32
|- style="background:#fbb;"
| 64
| March 8
| @ Indiana
| 
| Tobias Harris (22)
| Andre Drummond (15)
| Ish Smith (6)
| Bankers Life Fieldhouse14,353
| 31–33
|- style="background:#bfb;"
| 65
| March 9
| Cleveland
| 
| Reggie Jackson (21)
| Andre Drummond (16)
| Reggie Jackson (5)
| Palace of Auburn Hills19,421
| 32–33
|- style="background:#bfb;"
| 66
| March 11
| New York
| 
| Tobias Harris (28)
| Andre Drummond (15)
| Reggie Jackson (8)
| Palace of Auburn Hills19,607
| 33–33
|- style="background:#fbb;"
| 67
| March 14
| @ Cleveland
| 
| Tobias Harris (17)
| Andre Drummond (14)
| Reggie Jackson (6)
| Quicken Loans Arena20,562
| 33–34
|- style="background:#fbb;"
| 68
| March 15
| Utah
| 
| Ish Smith (16)
| Aron Baynes (12)
| Ish Smith (3)
| Palace of Auburn Hills14,033
| 33–35
|- style="background:#fbb;"
| 69
| March 17
| Toronto
| 
| Reggie Jackson (20)
| Andre Drummond (22)
| Reggie Jackson (6)
| Palace of Auburn Hills16,541
| 33–36
|- style="background:#bfb;"
| 70
| March 19
| Phoenix
| 
| Kentavious Caldwell-Pope (23)
| Andre Drummond (18)
| Kentavious Caldwell-Pope (8)
| Palace of Auburn Hills19,588
| 34–36
|- style="background:#fbb;"
| 71
| March 21
| @ Brooklyn
| 
| Tobias Harris (24)
| Andre Drummond (17)
| Ish Smith (4)
| Barclays Center14,343
| 34–37
|- style="background:#fbb;"
| 72
| March 22
| @ Chicago
| 
| Harris & Morris (14)
| Andre Drummond (17)
| Ish Smith (7)
| United Center21,503
| 34–38
|- style="background:#fbb;"
| 73
| March 24
| @ Orlando
| 
| Jon Leuer (16)
| Andre Drummond (14)
| Darrun Hilliard (4)
| Amway Center18,076
| 34–39
|- style="background:#fbb;"
| 74
| March 27
| @ New York
| 
| Marcus Morris (20)
| Andre Drummond (15)
| Ish Smith (5)
| Madison Square Garden19,812
| 34–40
|- style="background:#fbb;"
| 75
| March 28
| Miami
| 
| Kentavious Caldwell-Pope (25)
| Andre Drummond (13)
| Ish Smith (6)
| Palace of Auburn Hills17,160
| 34–41
|- style="background:#bfb;"
| 76
| March 30
| Brooklyn
| 
| Marcus Morris (28)
| Marcus Morris (13)
| Ish Smith (5)
| Palace of Auburn Hills15,804
| 35–41
|- style="background:#fbb;"
| 77
| March 31
| @ Milwaukee
| 
| Tobias Harris (23)
| Andre Drummond (13)
| Beno Udrih (8)
| BMO Harris Bradley Center18,717
| 35–42

|- style="background:#fbb;"
| 78
| April 5
| Toronto
| 
| Harris & Smith (16)
| Andre Drummond (14)
| Beno Udrih (8)
| Palace of Auburn Hills17,578
| 35–43
|- style="background:#bfb;"
| 79
| April 7
| @ Houston
| 
| Boban Marjanović (27)
| Boban Marjanović (12)
| Smith & Udrih (5)
| Toyota Center18,055
| 36–43
|- style="background:#bfb;"
| 80
| April 9
| @ Memphis
| 
| Bullock & Marjanović (14)
| Andre Drummond (11)
| Ish Smith (7)
| FedExForum16,521
| 37–43
|- style="background:#fbb;"
| 81
| April 10
| Washington
| 
| Tobias Harris (22)
| Boban Marjanović (8)
| Ish Smith (9)
| Palace of Auburn Hills21,012
| 37–44
|- style="background:#fbb;"
| 82
| April 12
| @ Orlando
| 
| Smith & Caldwell-Pope (20)
| Andre Drummond (14)
| Ish Smith (10)
| Amway Center19,458
| 37–45

Player statistics

Season

|- align="center" bgcolor=""
| 
|style="background:#eb003c;color:white;" |82 || 48 ||style="background:#eb003c;color:white;" |31.3 || .481 || .347 || .841 || 5.1 || 1.7 || .72 || .48 ||style="background:#eb003c;color:white;" |16.1
|- align="center" bgcolor="f0f0f0"
| 
| 52 || 50 || 27.4 || .420 ||style="background:#eb003c;color:white;" |.359 || .868 || 2.2 ||style="background:#eb003c;color:white;" |5.2 || .67 || .10 || 14.5
|- align="center" bgcolor=""
| 
| 79 || 79 || 32.5 || .418 || .331 || .784 || 4.6 || 2.0 || .66 || .32 || 14.0
|- align="center" bgcolor="f0f0f0"
| 
| 76 || 75 || 33.3 || .399 || .350 || .832 || 3.3 || 2.5 || 1.18 || .16 || 13.8
|- align="center" bgcolor=""
| 
| 81 ||style="background:#eb003c;color:white;" |81 || 29.7 || .530 || .286 || .386 ||style="background:#eb003c;color:white;" |13.8 || 1.1 ||style="background:#eb003c;color:white;" |1.53 ||style="background:#eb003c;color:white;" |1.10 || 13.6
|- align="center" bgcolor="f0f0f0"
| 
| 75 || 34 || 25.9 || .480 || .293 || .867 || 5.4 || 1.5 || .41 || .35 || 10.2
|- align="center" bgcolor=""
| 
| 81 || 32 || 24.1 || .439 || .267 || .706 || 2.9 ||style="background:#eb003c;color:white;" |5.2 || .75 || .41 || 9.4
|- align="center" bgcolor="f0f0f0"
| 
| 39 || 0 || 14.4 || .467 || .344 || .941 || 1.5 || 3.4 || .33 || .00 || 5.8
|- align="center" bgcolor=""
| 
| 35 || 0 || 8.4 ||style="background:#eb003c;color:white;" |.545 || .000 || .810 || 3.7 || .3 || .17 || .34 || 5.5
|- align="center" bgcolor="f0f0f0"
| 
| 75 || 2 || 15.5 || .513 || .000 || .840 || 4.4 || .4 || .23 || .52 || 4.9
|- align="center" bgcolor=""
| 
| 31 || 5 || 15.1 || .422 || .384 || .714 || 2.1 || .9 || .58 || .10 || 4.5
|- align="center" bgcolor="f0f0f0"
| 
| 77 || 1 || 17.8 || .353 || .292 || .679 || 2.5 || 1.4 || .73 || .31 || 4.4
|- align="center" bgcolor=""
| 
| 39 || 1 || 9.8 || .373 || .261 || .750 || .8 || .8 || .28 || .05 || 3.3
|- align="center" bgcolor="f0f0f0"
| 
| 19 || 2 || 7.7 || .359 || .294 || .500 || 2.2 || .4 || .05 || .7 || 3.2
|- align="center" bgcolor=""
| 
| 9 || 0 || 3.6 || .100 || .000 ||style="background:#eb003c;color:white;" |1.000 || .3 || .2 || .00 || .00 || 0.4
|}

Transactions

Overview

Trades

Free agency

Re-signed

Additions

Subtractions

References

Detroit Pistons seasons
Detroit Pistons
Detroit Pistons
Detroit Pistons